Peter Barrett may refer to:

 Peter Barrett (illustrator) (born 1935), British painter, illustrator, graphic designer and children's book author
 Peter Barrett (bishop) (1956–2015), Church of Ireland bishop
 Peter Barrett (sailor) (1935–2000), American sailor
 Peter Barrett (cricketer) (1955–1983), English cricketer
 Peter Barrett (geologist) (born 1940), New Zealand geologist and professor at Victoria University of Wellington
 Peter Barrett (politician), member of the Tasmanian House of Assembly
 Peter Barrett (entrepreneur), Australian entrepreneur